Hilde is one of several female given names derived from the name Hild formed from Old Norse hildr, meaning "battle". Hild, a Nordic-German Bellona, was a Valkyrie who conveyed fallen warriors to Valhalla. Warfare was often called Hild's Game. Hilde was popular in Norway from the 1950s until the 1970s. It is a variant of Hilda, which in turn is a more recent variation of Hildur.

Hilde Benjamin (1902–1989), East German judge who presided over political show trials
Hilde Bergebakken (born 1963), Norwegian Socialist Left Party politician
Hilde De Baerdemaeker (born 1978), Flemish actress
Hilde Bruch (1904–1984), German-born American psychiatrist and psychoanalyst
Hilde Coppi (1909–1943), German communist and anti-Nazi resistance fighter
Hilde Crevits (born 1967), Belgian politician
Hilde Domin (1909–2006), German lyric poet and writer
Hilde Gerg (born 1975), German former alpine skier
Hilde Güden (1917–1988), Austrian operatic soprano
Hilde Hagerup (born 1976), Norwegian novelist and children author
Hilde Haugsgjerd (born 1952), Norwegian newspaper editor
Hilde Heynen (born 1959), Belgian professor of architectural theory
Hilde Hildebrand (1897–1976), German actress
Hilde Himmelweit (1918–1989), German social psychologist
Hilde Holger (1905–2001), Austrian dancer, choreographer and dance teacher
Hilde Holovsky (died 1933), Austrian figure skater
Hilda Mary Hooke (1898–1978), Canadian writer
Hilde Houben-Bertrand (born 1940), Belgian Flemish politician and former provincial governor of Limburg
Hilde Hovdenak (born 1971), Norwegian retired long-distance runner
Hilde Hummelvoll (born 1960), Norwegian television personality
Hilde Indreberg (born 1957), Norwegian judge
Hilde Frafjord Johnson (born 1963), Norwegian Christian Democratic Party politician
Hilde Konetzni (1905–1980), Austrian operatic soprano
Hilde Körber (1906–1969), German film actress
Hilde Krahl (1917–1999), Austrian film actress
Hilde Lauer (born 1943), Romanian Olympic sprint canoer
Hilde Lindemann, American philosophy professor and bioethicist
Hilde Lyrån (born 1963), Norwegian actress, dancer, and comedian
Hilde Lysiak (born 2006), American journalist
Hilde Magnusson Lydvo (born 1970), Norwegian politician
Hilde Mangold (1898–1924), German embryologist
Hilde Marstrander (born 1969), Norwegian fashion journalist and illustrator
Hilde Meisel (1914–1945), Jewish German socialist, journalist and anti-Nazi resistance member
Hilde Østbø (born 1974), Norwegian Olympic handball player
Hilde Gjermundshaug Pedersen (born 1964)
Hilde Quintens (born 1964), Belgian cyclist
Hilde Riis (born 1959), Norwegian Olympic cross-country skier
Hilde Sandvik (born 1970), Norwegian journalist
Hilde Schrader (1910–1966), German Olympic swimmer
Hilde Schramm (born 1936), daughter of German architect and war criminal Albert Speer
Hilde Sherman (1923–2011), German Holocaust survivor and memoirist.
Hilde Singsaas (born 1972), Norwegian Labour Party politician
Hilde Krahwinkel Sperling (1908–1981), German tennis player
Hilde Strømsvold (born 1967), Norwegian football goalkeeper
Hilde Synnøve Lid (born 1971), Norwegian Olympic freestyle skier
Hilde Teerlinck (born 1966), Belgian curator
Hilde Tellesbø (born 1963), Norwegian orienteering competitor
Hilde Urbaniak, West German slalom canoeist
Hilde Vogt (born 1945), Norwegian politician
Hilde Waage (born 1959), Norwegian historian
Hilde Weissner (1909–1987), German actress
Hilde Zach (1942–2011), mayor of Innsbruck, Austria
Hilde Zadek (1917–2019), German operatic soprano
Hilde Zaloscer (1903–1999), Austrian art historian, Egyptologist, Coptologist, essayist and novelist
Hilde Ziegler (1939–1999), German actress
Hilde Zimmermann (1920–2002), Austrian resistance fighter against Nazism and survivor of the KZ Ravensbrück

See also
Hilde (disambiguation)
Hildegard, a female name derived from Old High German hild and gard
Hildegarde (disambiguation)

References

Danish feminine given names
German feminine given names